Almost Sunrise is a 2016 American documentary film directed by Michael Collins and produced by Marty Syjuco. It recounts the story of two Iraq veterans, Tom Voss and Anthony Anderson, who, in an attempt to put their combat experience behind them, embark on a 2,700-mile trek on foot across America. It made its world premiere on the opening night of the Telluride Mountainfilm Festival on 27 May 2016. After its theatrical run, it aired on the PBS series POV.

Premise
Two very troubled veterans of the war in Iraq, Tom Voss and Anthony Anderson, decide to walk from Milwaukee, Wisconsin, to Los Angeles – over 2,700 miles, taking 155 days – to help them heal from the combat experiences that haunt them. Along the way, the two men raised awareness of the unrelenting pain of moral injury many vets face and encouraged them to seek treatment.

Cast
 Thomas Voss
 Anthony Anderson

Response

References

External links 
 
 
 Almost Sunrise on POV

2016 films
American documentary films
2016 documentary films
2010s English-language films
2010s American films